Ettore Fieramosca is a 1938 Italian historical film directed by Alessandro Blasetti and starring Gino Cervi, Mario Ferrari and Elisa Cegani. It is adapted from the 1833 novel of the same title by Massimo D'Azeglio, based on the life of the 16th century condottiero Ettore Fieramosca.

Plot

Partial cast
 Gino Cervi as Ettore Fieramosca
 Mario Ferrari as Graiano d'Asti 
 Elisa Cegani as Giovanna di Morreale 
 Osvaldo Valenti as Guy de la Motte 
 Lamberto Picasso as Prospero Colonna 
 Corrado Racca as Don Diego Garcia de Paredes 
 Clara Calamai as Fulvia 
 Umberto Sacripante as Franciotto 
 Gianni Pons as Il duca di Nemours 
 Carlo Duse as Jacopo, lo scudiero spia di Graiano 
 Mario Mazza as Fanfulla
 Andrea Checchi as Gentilino

See also 
 Soldier of Fortune (1976)

References

Bibliography 
 Bondanella, Peter E. Italian Cinema: From Neorealism to the Present. Bloomsbury Publishing, 2001.

External links 
 

1938 films
Italian historical drama films
Italian black-and-white films
1930s historical drama films
1930s Italian-language films
Films directed by Alessandro Blasetti
Films set in Italy
Films set in the 1490s
Films set in the 16th century
Films based on Italian novels
1938 drama films
Films scored by Alessandro Cicognini
1930s Italian films